The 2017 Dr McKenna Cup, known for sponsorship reasons as the Bank of Ireland Dr McKenna Cup, was a Gaelic football competition in the province of Ulster for county and university teams.

Twelve teams took part – the nine Ulster county teams and three university teams, i.e. St Mary's University College, Belfast, Queen's University Belfast and Ulster University.

On 28 January 2017, Tyrone won their sixth title in a row, beating Derry by 2-13 to 1-7 in the final.

Format

Group Stage

The teams are drawn into three groups of four teams. Each team plays the other teams in its group once, earning 2 points for a win and 1 for a draw.

Ties are broken by score average (total scored divided by total conceded).

Knock-out Stage

The three group winners, and the best runner-up progress to the semi-finals with the two winners progressing to the final.

Group stage

Group A

Group A Table

Group A Rounds 1 to 3

Group B

Group B Table

Group B Rounds 1 to 3

Group C

Group C Table

Group C Rounds 1 to 3

Ranking of runners-up

Knock-out Stage

Semi-finals

Final

References

McKenna Cup
Dr McKenna Cup seasons